Pïleike was a Wayana village in the Sipaliwini District of Suriname. The village lies across the Lawa River from the island village of Kulumuli, which is considered to lie in French Guiana. As of 2009, the village is abandoned.

History 
Pïleike was the village of the influential shaman or pïyai of the same name. When he died in the late 1990s, he ordered his fellow villagers to cross the river and join Kulumuli.

Notes

References 

Former populated places in Suriname